As per FIFA regulations, The final team list of the 21 players (with of at least three are goalkeepers) selected to participate in the competition should notify the FIFA general secretariat, at least ten working days (19 July) before the opening match of the final competition.

Those marked in bold have been capped at full international level.

Group A

Head coach:  Eduardo Lara

Head coach:  Francis Smerecki

Head coach:  Cheick Fantamady Diallo

Head coach:  Lee Kwang-jong

Group B

Head coach:  Martin Ndtoungou

Head coach:  Chris Milicich

Head coach:  Ilídio Vale

Head coach:  Juan Verzeri

Group C

Head coach:  Jan Versleijen

Nick Feely replaced Lawrence Thomas on 22 July due to a thigh injury.
Mathew Leckie was withdrawn by his club side Borussia Mönchengladbach on 23 July 2011 and replaced by Corey Gameiro.

Head coach:  Rónald González Brenes

Head coach:  Sixto Vizuete

Head coach:  Julen Lopetegui

Group D

Head coach:  Ivan Grnja

Head coach:  Ever Hugo Almeida

Head coach:  John Obuh

Head coach:  Khalid Al-Koroni

Group E

Head coach:  Andreas Heraf

Head coach:  Ney Franco

Head coach:  Diaa El-Sayed

Head coach:  Alfredo Poyatos

Group F

Head coach:   Walter Perazzo

Head coach:  Brian Eastick

 Ryan Noble did not travel with the squad from their training camp in Denver, Colorado, to their base in Colombia, as he picked up a back injury in a training session.
 Dean Parrett returned home before England's round of 16 match with Nigeria, after injuring himself, also in a training session

Head coach:  Juan Carlos Chávez

Head coach:  Yun Jong-su

Player statistics
Player representation by club

Player representation by league

The England, Saudi Arabia, Egypt and North Korea squads were made up entirely of players from the respective countries' domestic leagues. 
Although Italy failed to qualify for the finals, their domestic leagues were represented by 9 players. Altogether, there were 37 national leagues that had players in the tournament.

References

External links
Official Squad list  at FIFA.com
Official site at FIFA.com

FIFA U-20 World Cup squads
2011 FIFA U-20 World Cup